Patrick Cronin may refer to:

 Patrick Henry Cronin (died 1889), member of Clan na Gael murdered in 1889
 Patrick Cronin (bishop) (1913–1991), Irish Roman Catholic archbishop of Cagayan de Oro
 Patrick Cronin (actor) (born 1941), stage, television, and film actor
 Patrick Cronin (hurler) (born 1987), Irish hurler
 Patrick John Cronin (1996–2016), person killed in a Melbourne coward-punch attack